Agriphila costalipartella is a moth in the family Crambidae. It was described by Harrison Gray Dyar Jr. in 1921. It is found in North America, where it has been recorded from Arizona, California, Nevada and Montana.

The wingspan is about 24 mm. Adults have been recorded on wing from July to August.

References

Crambini
Moths described in 1921
Moths of North America